Tarwon Jirapan (1 April 1939 – 22 July 2014) was a Thai cyclist. He competed in the individual road race and team time trial events at the 1964 Summer Olympics.

References

External links
 

1939 births
2014 deaths
Tarwon Jirapan
Tarwon Jirapan
Cyclists at the 1964 Summer Olympics
Place of birth missing
Asian Games medalists in cycling
Cyclists at the 1962 Asian Games
Medalists at the 1962 Asian Games
Tarwon Jirapan
Tarwon Jirapan
Tarwon Jirapan